This is a list of Parliamentary boroughs in the United Kingdom which were disenfranchised for corruption in the 19th century.

References 
 

Lists of constituencies of the Parliament of the United Kingdom
Corruption in the United Kingdom